Berberis libanotica  is a species of plant in the family Berberidaceae.

The etymology of the generic name is not certain. Berberis libanotica is considered by C. Schneider and most botanists after him as specifically distinct from B. cretica L. It is however very close to it and differs only by the absence of stomata on the upper side of the leaves, and is sometimes synonymized under Berberis cretica. It is a medicinal plant well known to the Lebanese, who make use of the solution obtained by maceration of its roots in tepid water for treating certain liver and gall bladder diseases. The investigation of its active agents was the topic of a doctorate dissertation in pharmacy submitted by J. Ades in 1948 at the French Faculty of Medicine, Beirut.

Description
Branches blackish red. provided with strong yellow spines, close to each other, often 3-parted.
Inflorescence in racemes smaller than leaves. Perianth made of 6 petal-like yellow sepals,  in diameter. Stamens ; anthers oval. Ovary topped by a thick sessile stigma. Fruit an ovate blackish berry.

Flowering
May–June.

Habitat
Mountains.

Distribution
Middle mountain, eastern slope, Hermon, Antilebanon.

Geographic area
Syria, Lebanon.

References

Georges Tohme& Henriette Tohme, Illustrated Flora of Lebanon, National Council For Scientific Research, Second Edition 2014.

libanotica
Flora of Lebanon and Syria
Plants described in 1905